Carlos Castañeda Mendez (born 4 January 1963) is a former Guatemalan footballer who was a member of the Guatemala national team and represented Guatemala at the 1988 Olympic Games.

Club career
A forward, Castañeda played for CD Suchitepequez and C.S.D. Comunicaciones in Guatemala.

International career
At the 1988 Olympics, he scored a goal in a 5-2 loss to Italy in Guatemala's first match (a header off of a free kick) and started all of Guatemala's three matches.

In qualifying for the 1990 World Cup, Castaneda scored a crucial goal (escaping the marking of John Limniatis to score a header from a corner) versus Canada in the second leg of Guatemala's second round encounter giving Guatemala a 2-0 lead which eventually helped Guatemala advance to the final round of CONCACAF qualifying on away goals. He took part in 14 World Cup qualification matches in total during the 1990 and 1994 campaigns.

Castañeda also represented Guatemala at the 1991 and 1996 CONCACAF Gold Cups.

References

External links
 

1963 births
Living people
Association football forwards
Guatemalan footballers
Guatemala international footballers
Olympic footballers of Guatemala
Footballers at the 1988 Summer Olympics
1991 CONCACAF Gold Cup players
1996 CONCACAF Gold Cup players
C.D. Suchitepéquez players
Comunicaciones F.C. players